Lectoure (Gascon: Leitora ) is a commune in the Gers department in the Occitanie region in southwestern France.

Geography
The village is located on the right bank of the Gers, which flows north through the western part of the commune. The river Auroue forms part of the commune's southeastern and northeastern borders.

History
Lectoure was a prehistoric oppidum, capital of Lactorates. Barbarian invasions forced residents to raise the walls and make Lectoure a stronghold for centuries. The town became the capital city of the Earldom of Armagnac in 1325, ruled by a powerful family descended from the ancient Dukes of Gascony, who held court at Lectoure. In 1473 Cardinal Jean de Jouffroy besieged the town on behalf of Louis XI. and after its fall put the whole population to the sword. In 1562 it again suffered severely at the hands of the Catholics under Blaise de Montluc.

Population

Sites of interest
Lectoure has been designated as a "town of art and history" (French: Villes et Pays d'Art et d'Histoire) by the French Ministry of Culture and Communication since 1985. The 12th-16th century former Lectoure Cathedral is a national monument. The town hall was built between 1676 and 1682 by bishop Hugues de Bar.

Way of St. James
Lectoure is a town on the Via Podiensis, one of the three major French arms of the Way of St. James. This route is followed by those making the pilgrimage from Le Puy by way of Saint-Jean-Pied-de-Port to Santiago de Compostella in northwest Spain. Pilgrims arrive at Lectoure after Miradoux and next pass through Marsolan and La Romieu.

Cuisine
Locally produced Armagnac and foie gras are available and popular delicacies.

Notable people 
 Pierre Charron
 Pierre Feuga, writer, translator
 Pey de Garros
 Joseph Lagrange
 Jean Lannes
 Paul Noël Lasseran
 Antoine de Roquelaure
 Aurélie Soubiran, Princess Ghika (1820–1904), writer.

See also
 Lectoure Cathedral
Communes of the Gers department

References

External links

 
 Lectoure on the map of France with many details via Wayback Machine
 Via Podiensis Map
 The Way of St. James French website

Communes of Gers